Thomas Barnard JP DL MP (1830–1909) was a Whig Member of Parliament for Bedford.

Biography

Born in Bedford on 21 March 1830, the second son of Thomas Barnard (1784-1853) of Thomas Barnard & Co Bank, Thomas Barnard was educated at Bedford School. He became head of the banking house as well an associate of Samuel Whitbread, and was elected, with Whitbread, as a Whig  Member of Parliament (MP) for Bedford at the General Election of 27 March 1857. He subsequently lost his seat at the General Election of 23 April 1859. He was Deputy Lieutenant of Bedfordshire between 1862 and 1909

Thomas Barnard died at Cople House on 31 March 1909, at the age of 79.

References

1830 births
1909 deaths
People educated at Bedford School
Members of the Parliament of the United Kingdom for English constituencies
UK MPs 1857–1859
Deputy Lieutenants of Bedfordshire
Whig (British political party) MPs for English constituencies
People from Bedford
People from Cople